Asrat Atsedeweyn is an Ethiopian statistician, academic administrator, servant leader and politician currently serving as president of University of Gondar, Ethiopia. He was previously Academic Vice President of the University of Gondar. He also holds Government office as a Representative of the House of Peoples in one of 10 regions of Ethiopia.

Early life and education 
Asrat Atsedeweyn was born in Simada Woreda in northwestern Ethiopia. He completed a BEd. in Mathematics at Bahir Dar University (2001), earned a MSc. in Statistics from Addis Ababa University (2008), and PhD. in Statistics (2014) from Andrha University India.

Career 
Atsedeweyn joined the faculty of the University of Gondar (UoG) in 2008 as a lecturer and in February of 2009 he became the head of the Department of Statistics. He served as dean of the College of Natural and Computational Sciences from October 2009 until September 2011. After the stint as dean, he held the position of Research and Publication Director for nine months and then he became Academic Vice President of the University from February 2016 through April 2019. Atsedeweyn assumed the presidency of the University in May 2019, succeeding former President Desalegn Mengesha. 

On 11 July 2021 he ran for a parliamentary seat in the Amhara State House of Peoples and Representatives and won a seat in the state legislature. He currently represents the Simada district which is found in the Southern Gondar Zone in the Amhara Region where he is a State Representative. 

Atsedeweyn has published articles in the field of statistics.

Awards and honors 
Atsedeweyn was elected a Executive Committee member of the Global One Health Initiative, Cash Ambassador, University of Gondar Comprehensive Specialized Hospital, lifetime member of Family Guidance Association of Ethiopia, lifetime member of the Indian Journal of Probability and Statistics, member of the American Statistics Association, member of the Ethiopian Statistical Association, member Ethiopian Economic Association and board member of the Gondar College of Teachers Education.

University leadership 
In his time as president of the University of Gondar Asrat Atsedeweyn has been able to work on a number of societal problem solving initiatives. In his short time as president he has been able to focus on inclusive issues when it comes to people with disabilities and also been able to further the aims of the University by helping those who are most vulnerable. 

Asrat has also been a crucial representative and brand ambassador in his various University leadership roles in bringing much needed partnerships and collaborations not only for the University, but the country as a whole.

References

External links
 
 Univ of Gondar President Bio
 2014 election results (see Amhara Region, "RC")

Academic staff of the University of Gondar
21st-century mathematicians
Statisticians
Heads of universities and colleges in Africa
Addis Ababa University alumni
1981 births
Living people
Ethiopian scientists